Luján de Cuyo is the district capital of the Luján de Cuyo Department located in the west of the Mendoza Province of Argentina. It forms part of the Greater Mendoza metropolitan area.

Wine

It was the first delineated appellation for the purposes of wine production, recognised by the International Organisation of Vine and Wine in 1993.

Situated in the upper Mendoza valley, where the river is half-way through its journey from the Andes mountains to the eastern plains, many Lujan de Cuyo vineyards sit at altitudes of around 1000 m (3280 ft). Malbec in particular is successful in Lujan de Cuyo, but the appellation also produces good Cabernet Sauvignon, Chardonnay and Torrontes. The majority of the vineyards are on alluvial soils; sandy or stony surfaces on clay substrata.

Sport

Asociación Atlético Luján de Cuyo are a football club that currently play in the regionalised Argentine 3rd division

Notable people
 Oscar Serpa, tango singer
 Leonardo Favio, singer, actor, film director and screenwriter

See also

Mendoza wine

External links
Luján de Cuyo city government website 

Populated places in Mendoza Province
Cities in Argentina
Argentina
Mendoza Province